Peersia is a genus of flowering plants belonging to the family Aizoaceae.

It is native to the Cape Provinces in the South African Republic.

The genus name of Peersia is in honour of Victor Stanley Peers (1874–1940), an Australian botanist, plant collector, and amateur archeologist. 
It was first described and published in Fl. Pl. South Africa Vol.7 on table 264 in 1927.

Known species
According to Kew:
Peersia frithii 
Peersia macradenia 
Peersia vanheerdei

References

Aizoaceae
Aizoaceae genera
Plants described in 1927
Flora of the Cape Provinces
Taxa named by Louisa Bolus